HLA-DR15 (DR15) is a HLA-DR serotype that recognizes the DRB1*1501 to *1505 and *1507 gene products. DR15 is found at high levels from Ireland to Central Asia. DR15 is part of the older HLA-DR2 serotype group which also contains the similar HLA-DR16 antigens.

Serology

Serotypes are unknown for the following alleles: DRB1*1506, *1508 to *1516, *1518 to *1522.
DRB1*1517N is a null.

Alleles

Disease associations

DR15 is positively associated Goodpasture syndrome, early age onset multiple sclerosis, pernicious anaemia, sarcoidosis, hypocretin deficiency associated narcolepsy
and a predisposition for postmenopausal osteoporosis.

DRB1*1501 is positively associated with Goodpasture syndrome, juvenile rheumatoid arthritis, allergic bronchopulmonary aspergillosis, multiple sclerosis, systemic lupus erythematosus, cervical cancer (human papillomavirus infection), Sjögren syndrome associated with systemic lupus erythematosus, and intermediate uveitis.

DRB1*1502 is associated with systemic lupus erythematosus, systemic sclerosis (SSc) & anti-topoisomerase antibodies.

DRB1*1503 is associated with Chaga's cardiomyopathy, allergic bronchopulmonary aspergillosis, multiple sclerosis, cervical cancer (human papillomavirus infection).

Extended linkage

DRB1*15:DQA1*0102:DQB1*0602 haplotype us associated with cervical cancer risk in (human papillomavirus infection)

DRB1*1502:DQA1*????:DQB1*0501 haplotype is associated with systemic lupus erythematosus

Genetic Linkage

HLA-DR15 is genetically linked to HLA-DR51 and HLA-DQ6 (HLA-DQ1) serotypes.

References

2